is a species of flowering plant in the family Hydrangeaceae that is endemic to Japan.

Description
Philadelphus satsumi is a deciduous shrub with white flowers, each having four petals.

Distribution
Philadelphus satsumi is endemic to Japan, where it occurs on Honshū (south from Iwate Prefecture), Shikoku, and Kyūshū (north of Kagoshima Prefecture).

References

satsumi
Endemic flora of Japan